Greves is a surname. Notable people with the surname include:

Catherine Greves (born 1982), English rower
Kent Greves (born 1968), Canadian volleyball player

See also
Greaves (surname)
Greeves (surname)
Greve (surname)
Grieves (surname)